Mehmil is a 1972 film starring Shiv Kumar and Farah. It was produced and directed by Bibhuti Mitra, with music by Sonik Omi.

Cast
 Farah  
 Shatrughan Sinha

External links

References

1972 films
1970s Hindi-language films